Daniel Ray Spradlin (born March 3, 1959) is a former American football linebacker in the National Football League for the Dallas Cowboys, Tampa Bay Buccaneers and St. Louis Cardinals. He was selected by the Cowboys in the fifth round of the 1981 NFL Draft. He played college football at the University of Tennessee.

Early years 

Spraldin attended Maryville High School in Maryville, Tennessee. He was a three-year starter at linebacker. He received All-State, All-South and Blount County Player of the Year honors as a junior and senior.

He accepted a football scholarship from the University of Tennessee. As a sophomore, he earned a starting outside linebacker spot late in the season. As a junior, he finished second on the team with 102 tackles. As a senior, he led the team with 125 tackles, including a 12 tackle performance against Vanderbilt University.

Professional career

Dallas Cowboys
Spradlin was selected by the Dallas Cowboys in the fifth round (137th overall) of the 1981 NFL Draft. His hard hitting allowed him to make the team over fellow rookie Scott Pelluer and the team also traded Bruce Huther to make room for him on the roster. He was a backup at middle linebacker for Bob Breunig.

In 2 seasons, he played in 25 games mostly on special teams, as he struggled learning the Cowboys flex defense. In 1983, he was converted into an offensive lineman, before being traded on August 24 to the Tampa Bay Buccaneers, in exchange for a fifth round selection (#113-Steve Pelluer) in the 1984 NFL Draft.

Tampa Bay Buccaneers
Spraldin was acquired for depth purposes and to play on the special teams units. In 2 seasons, he played in 31 games, starting two in 1983 because of injuries. He was released on August 26, 1985.

St. Louis Cardinals
On September 17, 1985, he was signed as a free agent by the St. Louis Cardinals. He played in seven games during the season.

References

External links
Just Sports Stats

Living people
1959 births
People from Maryville, Tennessee
Players of American football from Tennessee
American football linebackers
Tennessee Volunteers football players
Dallas Cowboys players
Tampa Bay Buccaneers players
St. Louis Cardinals (football) players